Marren is a surname. Notable people with the surname include:

 Adrian Marren, Irish Gaelic footballer
 Amy Marren (born 1998), British Paralympic swimmer
 Enda Marren (1934–2013), Irish solicitor and member of the Irish Council of State

See also
 Maren (disambiguation)